Dedeler is a village in Gülnar district of  Mersin Province, Turkey. It is situated to the west of Kızlardağ in the Taurus Mountains system. The name of the village Dedeler ("saints") refers to a Moslem preacher named Arap Dede. The main economic activities of the village are viticulture and beekeeping.

References

Villages in Gülnar District